The Bonn Graduate School of Economics, commonly referred to as BGSE, is the graduate school of the Department of Economics within the Faculty of Law and Economics of the University of Bonn. The BGSE is one of the leading research institutions in the field of economics in Germany. The school offers a master program in economics (2 years) and a doctoral program with an integrated master degree (2 years + 3 years). Students who want to pursue a doctoral degree can specialize in economic research within the master program and then continue with the dissertation phase. The BGSE is a founding member of the European Doctoral Program in Quantitative Economics. Students benefit from the collaborative research activities of the BGSE with the Institute on Behavior and Inequality, Institute for the Study of Labor, the Max Planck Institute for Research on Collective Goods, the Hausdorff Research Institute for Mathematics

The BGSE pursues research activities in the following five research areas:
 microeconomic theory
 management and applied microeconomics
 financial economics
 macroeconomics and public economics
 econometrics and statistics

Exchange programs 

The BGSE has collaborations with the following international partners: 
 UC Berkeley
 Yale University
 11 partner universities within ERASMUS
 7 partner universities within the European Doctoral Program

Faculty
The faculty comprises almost 40 professors and about 50 assistants. Many of them have received major awards, such as:
 Nobel Prize for Reinhard Selten (†) (1994)
 Leibniz Prize for Werner Hildenbrand (1988) and Armin Falk (2009)
 Max Planck Research Award for Werner Hildenbrand (1994) and Benny Moldovanu (2001)
 Gossen Prize for Jürgen von Hagen (1997), Benny Moldovanu (2004), and Armin Falk (2008)
 European Research Council grants for Armin Falk (2), Benny Moldovanu, Christian Bayer (2), Stephan Lauermann
Director/Speaker of the BGSE is Benny Moldovanu.

Placements 
BGSE alumni have obtained prestigious positions at universities in the U.S. (e.g., Harvard, Berkeley, Penn, UCLA, Michigan, Minnesota), in Europe (e.g., University College London, Pompeu Fabra, Tilburg, Carlos III, Stockholm, Zurich) and in Germany (e.g., Mannheim, Munich, Berlin, Cologne). In addition, many now work in the non-academic sector (e.g., European Central Bank, German Central Bank, Bank of England, U.S. Federal Reserve Board, McKinsey, Boston Consulting).

References

External links 
 http://www.bgse.uni-bonn.de
 European Doctoral Program
 German Economic Review

University of Bonn